Calab Law (born 31 December 2003) is an Australian sprinter. He is an indigenous athlete and a member of the Wakka Wakka people.

Law was selected for the Australian team for the 2022 World Athletics Championships – Men's 200 metres and in doing so became the fifth youngest male ever selected for the championships. At the event he ran a new personal best of 20.50 to progress into the semi-finals to become the first Australian teenager ever to qualify for a World or Olympic semi-final.

References

External links
 

2003 births
Living people
World Athletics Championships athletes for Australia
Indigenous Australian track and field athletes
Australian male sprinters